Ylg or YLG may refer to:

 Ylg or Ylgr, one of the Nordic ice rivers or Élivágar
 YLG, a pseudonym of Yehuda Leib Gordon